Bill Yung (born 1934) is a former American football coach.  He served as the head football coach at West Texas State University—now West Texas A&M University—from 1977 to 1981 and at the University of Texas at El Paso (UTEP) from 1982 to 1985, compiling a career college football record of 33–66–2.

Coaching career
After three seasons as head coach at Grand Prairie High School in Grand Prairie, Texas, Yung became an assistant under Grant Teaff at Baylor University. Prior to the 1974 season he was appointed to offensive coordinator. From 1977 to 1981, he served as the head football coach at West Texas A&M University. During that tenure, he compiled a 26–27–2 record. 

From 1982 to 1985, he coached at the University of Texas at El Paso (UTEP) with a record of 7–39. His overall college football coaching record was 33–66–2. His offensive coordinator at UTEP was Hal Mumme, a pioneer of the passing game. Mumme had also served as Yung's offensive backfield coach at West Texas.

After coaching, Yung became vice president of a disability insurance company.

Head coaching record

College

References

1934 births
Living people
Baylor Bears football coaches
UTEP Miners football coaches
West Texas A&M Buffaloes football coaches
High school football coaches in Texas